Never on Sunday is an album by Ramsey Lewis' Trio featuring tracks recorded in 1961 and released on the Argo label.

Reception

Allmusic awarded the album 3 stars stating "Pianist Ramsey Lewis, bassist Eldee Young, and drummer Red Holt had one of the most popular groups in jazz of the era, playing soulful and melodic versions of standards that were both swinging and accessible".

Track listing
 "The Ripper" (Ramsey Lewis) - 2:00    
 "I Got Plenty of Nothing'" (George Gershwin, Ira Gershwin, DuBose Heyward) - 3:39   
 "Water Boy" (Traditional) - 3:00    
 "Thanks for the Memory" (Ralph Rainger, Leo Robin) - 3:32    
 "Celito Lindo" (Traditional) - 2:35    
 "You Just Don't Care" (El Dee Young) - 3:08   
 "Never on Sunday" (Manos Hadjidakis) - 2:10    
 "You've Changed" (Bill Carey, Carl Fischer) - 4:09    
 "The Breeze and I" (Ernesto Lecuona, Al Stillman) - 2:36    
 "Exactly Like You" (Dorothy Fields, Jimmy McHugh) - 2:34

Personnel 
Ramsey Lewis - piano
El Dee Young - bass
Issac "Red" Holt - drums

References 

 

1961 albums
Ramsey Lewis albums
Argo Records albums
Albums produced by Leonard Chess